Acanthiophilus lugubris is a species of tephritid or fruit flies in the genus Acanthiophilus of the family Tephritidae.

Distribution
India.

References

Tephritinae
Insects described in 1939
Diptera of Asia